Suphisellus puncticollis is a species of burrowing water beetle in the subfamily Noterinae. It was described by Crotch in 1873 and is found in Canada and the United States.

References

Suphisellus
Beetles described in 1873